Thomas Powell (18 June 1817 – 6 April 1887) was a British missionary sent by the London Missionary Society (LMS) in 1844 to Samoa where he remained for 43 years. He was interested in botany, zoology and anthropology and was elected as a Fellow of the Linnean Society of London. During his time on the islands he recorded details of flora, fauna and the culture of the indigenous people.

Samoa mission
Thomas Powell was born in Cookham Dean, Berkshire and attended Hackney Theological Academy from 1839. He was ordained 29 May 1844 and left London 6 June 1844 with his wife on the inaugural voyage of the missionary barque John Williams. They arrived on the Samoan island of Tutila 31 January 1845 en route to their posting at Savai'i. Powell had little knowledge of the language at this time so his missionary work was initially limited, but he did have medical knowledge and used this to treat those in need.  In 1846 Powell was stationed at Pago Pago and in 1848 he went with John Geddie to Aneityum, in what is now Vanuatu, returning in 1849 in bad health to Samoa. He was suffering from malaria, but went against Geddie's wishes. He later wrote that a disagreement had occurred between the missionaries. On his return to Samoa, Powell was stationed at Tutuila where he remained for a large part of his time.

As a botanist, Powell had special interests in bryophytes, fungi and lichens. Herbarium specimens collected by him in the south Pacific region between 1860 and 1890 have been indexed by the Linnean Society of London and a list of the material was published by the society in 2011. He identified many of the Samoan names of plants and his paper on the subject, On Various Samoan Plants and Their Vernacular Names, was published in the 1868 Journal of Botany, British and Foreign, volume 6. Other papers forwarded to the Linnean Society by Powell included details of the poisons used by Samoan islanders to tip arrows and spears. He also submitted a paper on the formation of Atolls. The paper was read, but due to a critical review by Charles Darwin, it was not published. 

Powell helped George Pratt compile his dictionary of the Samoan language. He also transcribed the Samoan story of the creation, told to him by a Samoan chief—Taua-nu'u.  This is a valuable record of the islanders beliefs before the arrival of the missionaries. In 1886, he published a book called A Manual of Zoology Embracing the Animals of the Scripture, in the Samoan dialect.  Many of the animals would have been unknown to the Samoans, so Powell included illustrations where possible. After his death his wife forwarded some of his papers written in Samoan to the Rev. George Pratt in Sydney Australia. Due to failing eyesight Pratt was unable to make use of the works but a colleague, John Fraser, translated the manuscripts of Samoan myths and folks songs and published them in 1896.

His interests extended to ornithology and he corresponded with Philip Sclater, secretary of the Zoological Society of London, sending specimens for identification. These were passed to Osbert Salvin who presented his findings to the Society in a report 6 January 1879.

Bully Hayes
Bully Hayes was a notorious recruiter of native labour in the South Seas using trickery or kidnap.  The practice referred to as blackbirding, supplied plantation owners with workers who often never returned to their homeland.  In 1872 Hayes was arrested by Captain Meade of the USS Narragansett in Samoa.  However, after investigation, he was released due to lack of evidence. Powell, who had tried before to have Hayes prosecuted, wrote:
How is it that with such a mass of evidence as was collected on his detention here, which is in British blue books proving his kidnapping of the people of Manahiki, that he is allowed to go at large?

He had previously written: 
It will be a lamentable inconsistency on the parts of the British and French governments if this iniquitous traffic be allowed under their flags after their intervention, only a few years ago to put a stop to Peruvian proceedings of the same character.

Bully Hayes was killed by a crew mate in 1877.

Family
Powell died on 6 April 1887 in Penzance, Cornwall, and is buried in St John the Baptist Churchyard, Eltham, London, England, with his wife Jane Emma and one of his daughters—Hannah. Thomas and Jane Powell had at least seven children; their eldest daughter, Jane Anne (1846–1920), married wealthy James Spicer Jr. (1846–1915), who ran the wholesale paper merchants James Spicer & Sons Limited with his brother Sir Albert Spicer. James Spicer was named as Powell's executor in his will.

Legacy
Plant and animal species named after Thomas Powell:
 Clytorhynchus vitiensis powelli (Pinarolestes powelli), or Manu'a shrikebill, described and named by Osbert Salvin in 1879
 Faradaya powellii, named by Berthold Carl Seemann
 Trichomanes powellii, described by John Gilbert Baker
 Asplenium powellii, described by John Gilbert Baker
 Phymatosorus powellii (Polypodium powellii) described by John Gilbert Baker
 Clinostigma powelliana, described by Odoardo Beccari

Publications

References

External links
School of Oriental and African Studies (SOAS) Archives, University of London (London Missionary Society Archives)
Harvard University Herbaria & Libraries page

1809 births
1887 deaths
English Congregationalist missionaries
British botanists
Botanists active in the Pacific
Fellows of the Linnean Society of London
British expatriates in American Samoa
Congregationalist missionaries in American Samoa
Congregationalist missionaries in Vanuatu
British expatriates in Vanuatu
Missionary botanists